Qualquer Gato Vira-Lata (lit. "Any Stray Cat") is a 2011 Brazilian romantic comedy film directed by Tomas Portella. Based on the 1998 play Qualquer Gato Vira-Lata tem uma Vida Sexual Mais Saudável que a Nossa (English: Any Stray Cat Has a Healthier Sex Life Than Ours) by Juca de Oliveira, it stars Cléo Pires, Malvino Salvador, and Dudu Azevedo.

A sequel is set to be released in the second half of 2014 with the three main actors and director set to return.

Plot
In Rio de Janeiro, Tati (Cléo Pires) meets her boyfriend Marcelo (Dudu Azevedo) on his birthday and he breaks-up with her, claiming that she is not romantic.

An unbalanced Tati enters the class of the biologist Conrado (Malvino Salvador) and hears his lesson about evolution, where he tells that modern women have destroyed years of evolution with their attitudes and lack of romanticism.

Later, Tati meets Conrado on the street and offers to work with him in his thesis. Conrado teaches Tati the correct behavior of a woman and how to seduce her mate.

Meanwhile, Marcelo feels jealous about Conrado, who feels attracted by Tati and learns that his theory is not correct. A love triangle is formed.

Cast
 Cléo Pires as Tati
 Malvino Salvador as Conrado
 Dudu Azevedo as Marcelo
 Rita Guedes as Olga Portella
 Álamo Facó as Magrão (Paulo Sergio)
 Letícia Novaes as Laura

References

External links
 
 

2011 films
2011 romantic comedy films
Brazilian romantic comedy films
Brazilian films based on plays
Films shot in Rio de Janeiro (city)
2010s Portuguese-language films